Kangani may refer to:

Kangani, Anjouan, a village in the Comoros
Kangani, Mayotte, a village on Mayotte
Kangani, Mohéli, a town in the Comoros
Kangani system, a form of labour recruitment and management